Emmanuel Kiwanuka Nsubuga (5 November 1914 – 20 April 1991) was the first Archbishop of the Archdiocese of Kampala from 1966 to 1990 and a cardinal from 1976 until his death. He was an opponent of human rights abuses of the military dictatorship of Idi Amin.

During Amin's rule Cardinal Nsubuga spoke against the Government's human rights abuses. He also encouraged priests and nuns throughout the country to shelter people fleeing harassment by the army during the civil war that later raged during the Government of Milton Obote.

He was succeeded in 1990 as Archbishop of Kampala by Emmanuel Wamala, who became a Cardinal in 1994.

References

1914 births
1991 deaths
Cardinals created by Pope Paul VI
Ugandan cardinals
20th-century Roman Catholic archbishops in Uganda
Roman Catholic archbishops of Kampala